Bahawalnagar Junction railway station is located in Pakistan.

See also
 List of railway stations in Pakistan
 Pakistan Railways

References

Railway stations in Bahawalnagar District
Railway stations on Bahawalnagar–Fort Abbas Branch Line
Railway stations on Samasata–Amruka Branch Line